William Humphreys may refer to:
William Y. Humphreys (1890–1933), U.S. Congressman from Mississippi
William Jackson Humphreys (1862–1949), American physicist and meteorologist
William Humphreys Jackson (1839–1915), U.S. Congressman from Maryland
William Humfrey (died 1579), also written William Humphreys, Elizabethan goldsmith
William Benbow Humphreys (1889–1965), South African politician
William Humphreys (footballer), English footballer
Billy Humphreys (1884–?), English footballer

See also
William Humfreys (died 1735), Lord Mayor of London
Bill Humphries, actor
Billy Humphries (born 1936), Northern Irish footballer
William Humphrey (disambiguation)